Just Can't Get Enough: New Wave Hits of the '80s is a series of compilations issued by Rhino Records, on both CD and audio cassette, featuring various artists from the new wave era 1977–1985.

The series contained 15 volumes. The first five were released on 21 June 1994, and concentrated mostly on music issued between 1977 and 81, with a few tracks from '82.  (Despite the "New Wave Hits of the '80s" subtitle, Volume 1 actually contains no tracks from the 1980s; tracks from 1980 and later begin appearing midway through Volume 2.)  Volumes 6–10 were issued on 18 October 1994, and mostly featured songs from 1982, spilling a little into 1983.  The last five volumes were issued on 20 June 1995, and featured songs covering 1983 to 1985. Additional themed volumes—New Wave Dance Hits, New Wave Women, New Wave Halloween, and New Wave Christmas—came out in subsequent years. Rhino Records discontinued the series, due to rights issues and with no plans to re-release them. Many of the songs in the series are mastered from the 7" single masters. The series includes some songs making their first CD appearance (in some rare cases, their only CD appearance).

Volume 1
The first volume was released on both CD [R2 71694] and audio cassette on 21 June 1994.

Volume 2 
The second volume was released on CD [R2 71695] and audio cassette on 21 June 1994. Includes liner notes by Roy Trakin.

Volume 3 

The third volume was released on CD [R2 71696] and audio cassette on 21 June 1994.

Volume 4 

The fourth volume was released on both CD [R2 71697] and audio cassette on 21 June 1994. Includes liner notes by Andrew Sandoval.

Volume 5 

The fifth volume was released on both CD [R2 71698] and audio cassette on 21 June 1994. The booklet included liner notes by Andy Zax.

Volume 6 

The sixth volume was released on 18 October 1994 on CD [R2 71699] and audio cassette. The booklet included liner notes by Andy Zax. The CD includes Code Blue's "Face to Face" and Any Trouble's "Second Choice" as bonus tracks.

Volume 7 

The seventh volume was released on both CD [R2 71700] and audio cassette on 18 October 1994. The booklet includes liner notes by Jim Green.

Volume 8 

The eighth volume in the series, was released on both CD [R2 71701] and audio cassette on 18 October 1994. Booklet includes liner notes by Jim Fouratt. The CD included "Cath" by The Bluebells, Rachel Sweet's "Voo Doo" and Heaven 17's "(We Don't Need This) Fascist Groove Thang" as bonus tracks.

Volume 9 

The ninth volume in the series was released on both CD [R2 71702] and audio cassette on 18 October 1994. Booklet includes liner notes by Jean Rosenbluth. The CD includes Marshall Crenshaw's "Whenever You're on My Mind" and Killer Pussy's "Teenage Enema Nurses in Bondage" as bonus tracks.

Volume 10 

The tenth volume was released on both CD [R2 71703] and audio cassette on October 18, 1994. It contains the rarely heard The Little Girls' "Earthquake Song." The CD included Rank and File's "Amanda Ruth" as a bonus track. Booklet includes liner notes by Roy Trakin (liner notes for each song are in order by the track listing, unlike the previous volumes).

Volume 11 

The eleventh volume was released on both CD [R2 71974] and audio cassette on June 20, 1995.  The cheerfully inaccurate liner notes by Andy Zax dwell at some length on The Fixx being one of the most successful new wave bands from Australia; they are in fact from England.

Volume 12 

The twelfth volume was released on both CD [#R2 71975] and audio cassette on June 20, 1995. The CD contains bonus tracks including Tracey Ullman's "They Don't Know," The Rave-Up's "Positively Lost Me," Marlyn's "Calling Your Name," and Cabaret Voltaire's "Sensoria."

Volume 13 

The thirteenth volume was released on both CD [#R2 71976] and audio cassette on June 20, 1995.

Volume 14 

The fourteenth volume was released on both CD [R2 71977] and audio cassette on June 20, 1995. The booklet includes liner notes by Brett Milano.

Volume 15 

The fifteenth volume was released on both CD [R2 71977] and audio cassette on June 20, 1995. Includes liner notes by Jean Rosenbluth.

Compilation credits

Compiled & Produced for release by: David McLees & Andrew Sandoval

Sound Produced by: Bill Inglot

Compilation Assistance: David Kapp, Emily Cagan, Jim Neill, Brady Benton, Ken Lesnik, Joe Phiefer, Ted Myers, Gary Peterson, Gary Stewart, Chris Farman

The licensing King: Mark Pinkus

Discographical Annotations: Patrick Milligan

Project Assistance: Garson Foos, Keith Altomare, Jim Neill, Steve Poltorak, Craig Kamins, Bill Inglot, Jock Elliot, Antone DeSantis, Arny Schorr, Darcy Sullvan, Stephen K. Peeles, Norma Edwards, Nancy Hopkins, Michaeal Mazzarella, Nat Brewster, Janet Grey, David Miller.

Research: Patrick Milligan, Gary Peterson

Remastering: Bill Inglot, Andrew Sandoval & Ken Perry

Front Cover Photo: Blind Gary & Dirty Pierre Silva (Volumes 6–15 only)

Design: Julie Vlasak (Volumes 6–15 only) & Steve Bates

Art Direction (Volumes 6–15 only): Monster X

Rhino New Wave Hits of the '80s Team: Keith Altomare, Steve Bates, Emily Cagan, Chris Clarke, Julie D'Angelo, David Born, Garson Foos, Teresa McGurrin, David McLees, Jim Neill, David Newberg, Mark Pinkus, Faithe Raphael

Special Thanks: Michael Ackerman, James Austin, Hugo Bernham, Jay Boberg, Chris Castle, Cliff Chenfeld, Paul Cope/Record Rover, Jesse & Rachel Donahue, Richard Foos, Maria Garza, Jeff Gold, Paul Grein, Tanya Harman, Bruce Harris, Keith Johnson, Lisa Kellerhouse, Howie Klein, Scott Lasker, Bill Levenson, Tom Lopinski, Donna Malyszko, Toby Mamis, Paul C. Mawhinney/Record Rama, Maria Mandez, Brad Morrison, Mark Mulcahy, Frankie Pine, Ken Reed/Main Street Records, Fred Schneider, Suzanne Steers, Lisa Sutton, Gerrard Talbot, David Tedds, Vincent Vero, Paul Williams

References

1994 compilation albums
1995 compilation albums
Compilation album series
New wave compilation albums
Rhino Records compilation albums